Asian-Americans in Maryland are residents of the state of Maryland who are of Asian ancestry. As of the 2010 U.S. Census, Asian-Americans were 6.1% of the state's population. The ten largest Asian-American populations in Maryland are Indians, Chinese, Koreans, Filipinos, Vietnamese, Pakistanis, Japanese, Taiwanese, Thai, and Burmese. There are smaller numbers of Bangladeshis, Nepalis, Cambodians, and Sri Lankans.

See also

 Chinatown, Baltimore
 Filipino Cultural Association
 Greater Washington Area Asian-American demographics
 History of Koreans in Baltimore
 Koreans in Washington, D.C.
 Kunzang Palyul Choling
 Metro Chinese Network
 Murugan Temple of North America
 Sri Siva Vishnu Temple
 Washington Bangla Radio on Internet
 Washington Metropolitan Association of Chinese Schools

References

External links

 ASHA for Women (Asian Women’s Self Help Association)
 Asian American Center of Frederick
 Asian American Retailers' Association of Maryland
 Asian American Youth Leadership Empowerment and Development
 Association of Vietnamese Americans
 Baltimore Bhutanese Committee
 Governor's Commission on Asian Pacific American Affairs
 Gujarati Samaj of Baltimore
 Thai Alliance in America (TAA)